Pedro Martínez González, better known as Pedrés (11 February 1932 – 6 September 2021) was a Spanish bullfighter.

Biography
On 8 June 1952, he participated in a bullfight alongside Juan Montero.

References

1932 births
2021 deaths
Spanish bullfighters
Sportspeople from Albacete